Rambler Channel Typhoon Shelter is a typhoon shelter in the Rambler Channel, near Kwai Chung, Hong Kong.

Rambler Channel Public Cargo Working Area is just inside the typhoon shelter for ships loading and unloading cargo.

See also
 List of typhoon shelters in Hong Kong

References

Typhoon shelters in Hong Kong
Kwai Tsing District